Persona non grata, in the context of Philippine local governance, refers individuals or groups declared as unwelcome in a particular locality.

Definition
Persona non grata means an unwelcome person in Latin. In the context of diplomacy or international relations, a persona non grata declaration on a foreign citizen, usually a diplomat who otherwise has a privilege of immunity, is barred from entering the country which issued the declaration. In the context of local governance in the Philippines, local government units (LGUs, including municipalities, cities, and provinces) could declare a person persona non grata. One such reason for a move is in response to the particular person breaking local ordinances and laws.

The declaration would imply that a person is barred from entering the jurisdiction of a particular locality. However, according to a Department of the Interior and Local Government (DILG) legal opinion, persona non grata declarations are often made through resolutions by the local legislature rather than ordinances and is merely made to express a sentiment; which effectively meant that such declarations are non-binding. In the case of the municipal council of Anahawan, Southern Leyte declaring then-newly installed Mayor Roberto Loquinte as persona non grata for their opinion of Loquinte being unfit for the position, the DILG said that the local legislature is within their right to issue the declaration but the same must be done "within the bounds of the law". It said that it could not legally prevent Loquinte from assuming the position as Mayor and/or discharging his function, an act which the DILG finds reprehensible

Notable personae non gratae 

The following are notable people or groups who were declared as persona non grata by local government units (LGUs) in the Philippines. This excludes foreigners who were only barred entry and/or deported by the Philippine national government but includes foreigners who were declared as persona non grata by LGUs.

Celebrities

Politicians and government officials

Groups

Usage by non-governmental entities
Aside from usage under the context of international diplomacy, persona non grata has been devised by non-governmental bodies in the Philippines. Such organization include the Philippine Olympic Committee (POC), a private entity. The POC in 2011 declared former Philippine Karatedo Federation (PKF) president Go Teng Kok as persona non grata for violating the Olympic body's constitution and by-laws by taking legal action to prevent the recognition of then-newly installed PKF Enrico Vasquez. In 2021, it did the same to Philippine Athletics Track and Field Association (PATAFA) Philip Juico for his "malicious" public statements against Ernest John Obiena related to his federation's dispute on Obiena's accountability for the coaching fees of his coach.

References

Latin legal terminology
Blacklisting
Shunning
Law of the Philippines